Siberian Federal District (Sibirsky federalny okrug) is one of the eight federal districts of Russia. The entire federal district lies within the continent of Asia.

The district was created by presidential decree on 13 May 2000 and covers around 30% of the total land area of Russia. In November 2018, Buryatia and Zabaykalsky Krai were removed from the Siberian Federal District and added to the Far Eastern Federal District in accordance with a decree issued by Russian President Vladimir Putin.

Demographics

Federal subjects
The district comprises the West Siberian (part) and East Siberian economic regions and ten federal subjects:

Religion and ethnicity

According to a 2012 survey, 28.9% of the population of the current federal subjects of the Siberian Federal District (excluding Buryatia and Zabaykalsky Krai) adheres to the Russian Orthodox Church, 5.2% are unaffiliated generic Christians, 1.9% is an Orthodox believer without belonging to any church or adheres to other (non-Russian) Orthodox churches, 1.4% is an adherent of Islam, 1.2% is an adherant of Buddhism, and 1.6% adhere to some native faith such as Rodnovery, Tengrism, or Tuvan Shamanism. In addition, 33.2% of the population declares to be "spiritual but not religious", 18.7% is atheist, and 7.9% follows other religions or did not give an answer to the question.

Ethnic composition, according to the 2010 census: 

Total – 19,256,426
Russians – 16,542,506 (85.91%)
Buryats – 442,794 (2.30%)
Tuvans – 259,971 (1.35%)
Ukrainians – 227,353 (1.18%)
Tatars – 204,321 (1.06%)
Germans – 198,109 (1.03%)
Kazakhs – 117,507 (0.61%)
Altaians – 72,841 (0.38%)
Khakass — 70,859 (0.37%)
Armenians – 63,091 (0.33%)
Azerbaijanis – 54,762 (0.28%)
Belarusians – 47 829 (0.25%)
Uzbeks – 41,799 (0.22%)
Chuvash – 40,527 (0.21%)
Tajiks – 32,419 (0.17%)
Kyrgyz — 30,871 (0.16%)
Mordva – 19,238 (0.10%)
Roma – 15,162 (0.08%)
Bashkirs – 12 929 (0.07%)
Shors – 12 397 (0.06%)
Koreans – 11,193 (0.06%)
Moldovans – 11 155 (0.06%)
Evenks – 10,243 (0.05%)
Jews – 9,642 (0.05%)
Mari – 9,116 (0.05%)
Chinese — 9,075 (0.05%)
Udmurts – 8,822 (0.05%)
Poles – 8,435 (0.04%)
Georgians – 7,884 (0.04%)
Estonians – 7,112 (0.04%)
Dolgans – 5,854 (0.03%)
Persons who did not indicate nationality – 561,206 (2.91%)

Presidential plenipotentiary envoys
 Leonid Drachevsky (18 May 2000 – 9 September 2004)
 Anatoly Kvashnin (9 September 2004 – 9 September 2010)
 Viktor Tolokonsky (9 September 2010 – 12 May 2014)
 Nikolay Rogozhkin (12 May 2014 – 28 July 2016)
 Sergey Menyaylo (28 July 2016 – 9 April 2021)
 Anatoly Seryshev (from 12 October 2021)

See also 
 Siberia

References

External links 
 Images of the Siberian Federal District

 
Federal districts of Russia
States and territories established in 2000
2000 establishments in Russia